Immediately outside the Oval Office, Oval Office Operations staff manage the President's personal schedule, private engagements and immediate access to meet with the President of the United States. Though it varies from administration to administration—and within each term—Oval Office Operations typically consists of a Director of Oval Office Operations, a Personal Secretary to the President, and a Personal Aide to the President (body man).

Current personnel
 Director of Oval Office Operations: Annie Tomasini
 Deputy Director of Oval Office Operations: Ashley Williams
 Personal Secretary to the President: 
 Personal Aide to the President: Jacob Spreyer

See also
 White House Office

References

External links
 President's Outer Office

White House Office